Palaganangudy is a panchayat town in Tiruchirappalli district in the Indian state of Tamil Nadu.

Demographics
 India census, Palaganangudy had a population of 8880. Males constitute 50% of the population and females 50%. Palaganangudy has an average literacy rate of 74%, higher than the national average of 59.5%: male literacy is 79%, and female literacy is 68%. In Palaganangudy, 13% of the population is under 6 years of age.

References

Villages in Tiruchirappalli district